In Greek mythology, Leitus (Ancient Greek: Λήϊτος Leϊtos) was a leader of the Boeotians and admiral of 12 ships which sailed against Troy.

Family 
Leitus was the son of Alector (Alectryon) and Polybule or of Lacritus and Cleobule. He was the brother of Clonius, and probably the half-sibling of other Boeotian leaders, Arcesilaus and Prothoenor. 

In some accounts, Leitus was described as an earth-born and thus a son of Gaia (Earth).

Mythology 
Leitus also sailed with the Argonauts and afterwards, as one of the suitors of Helen, fought in the Trojan War, where he killed 20 enemies, including Phylacus.

Leitus was one of the seven Achaean leaders (others being Teucer, Thoas, Meriones, Antilochus, Peneleos and Deipyrus) in front of whom Poseidon appeared during the Trojans' attack on the Achaean ships, urging them to fight back instead of acting like cowards. He was wounded by Hector on the hand at the wrist, but in the end, he was the only Boeotian leader to safely return home after the Trojan War. He also brought back the remains of Arcesilaus, another Boeotian chieftain, and buried them near the city of Lebadea. His own tomb was at Plataeae.

Notes

References 

 Apollodorus, The Library with an English Translation by Sir James George Frazer, F.B.A., F.R.S. in 2 Volumes, Cambridge, MA, Harvard University Press; London, William Heinemann Ltd. 1921. ISBN 0-674-99135-4. Online version at the Perseus Digital Library. Greek text available from the same website.
Diodorus Siculus, The Library of History translated by Charles Henry Oldfather. Twelve volumes. Loeb Classical Library. Cambridge, Massachusetts: Harvard University Press; London: William Heinemann, Ltd. 1989. Vol. 3. Books 4.59–8. Online version at Bill Thayer's Web Site
 Diodorus Siculus, Bibliotheca Historica. Vol 1-2. Immanel Bekker. Ludwig Dindorf. Friedrich Vogel. in aedibus B. G. Teubneri. Leipzig. 1888–1890. Greek text available at the Perseus Digital Library.
 Euripides, The Plays of Euripides, translated by E. P. Coleridge. Volume II. London. George Bell and Sons. 1891. Online version at the Perseus Digital Library.
 Euripides, Euripidis Fabulae. vol. 3. Gilbert Murray. Oxford. Clarendon Press, Oxford. 1913. Greek text available at the Perseus Digital Library.
 Gaius Julius Hyginus, Fabulae from The Myths of Hyginus translated and edited by Mary Grant. University of Kansas Publications in Humanistic Studies. Online version at the Topos Text Project.
 Homer, The Iliad with an English Translation by A.T. Murray, Ph.D. in two volumes. Cambridge, MA., Harvard University Press; London, William Heinemann, Ltd. 1924. Online version at the Perseus Digital Library.
 Homer, Homeri Opera in five volumes. Oxford, Oxford University Press. 1920. Greek text available at the Perseus Digital Library.
 Pausanias, Description of Greece with an English Translation by W.H.S. Jones, Litt.D., and H.A. Ormerod, M.A., in 4 Volumes. Cambridge, MA, Harvard University Press; London, William Heinemann Ltd. 1918. Online version at the Perseus Digital Library
 Pausanias, Graeciae Descriptio. 3 vols. Leipzig, Teubner. 1903.  Greek text available at the Perseus Digital Library.
 Tzetzes, John, Allegories of the Iliad translated by Goldwyn, Adam J. and Kokkini, Dimitra. Dumbarton Oaks Medieval Library, Harvard University Press, 2015. 

Ancient Greek military personnel
Argonauts
Achaean Leaders

Boeotian characters in Greek mythology